Charles-Augustin van de Werve, count of Vorselaar, baron of Lichtaert and of Rielen

Family 
He was the son of Augustin van de Werve, baron of Lichtaert and of Marie-Anne van Colen. When his grandfather (Charles IV Bernard van de Werve, 2nd Count of Vorsselaer) died, he inherited the title of count of Vorselaer.

Charles-Augustin was a mentally handicapped person. He was officially the count of Vorselaar, but it was his younger brother, Louis-Paul, who used the title. 
Charles-Augustin lived in the castle of Klavarblad and Louis-Paul lived in the castle of Vorselaar. 

Louis-Paul became never count of Vorselaar, because he died before his brother, he was just baron of Lichtaert.

|-

1786 births
1862 deaths
Charles-Augustin
Counts of Vorselaar
Barons of Lichtaart
Barons of Rielen